Flavoparmelia caperata, the common greenshield lichen, is a foliose lichen that grows on the bark of trees, and occasionally on rock.

Identification
Flavoparmelia caperata is a medium to large foliose lichen that has a very distinctive pale yellow green upper cortex when dry. The lobes of the thallus may be smooth, but quite often have a wrinkled appearance especially in older specimens. The lower surface is black except for a brown margin; rhizoids attached to the lower surface are black and unbranched.

Similar species
The very similar Flavoparmelia baltimorensis grows mainly on rock and has globose, pustular outgrowths (somewhat similar to isidia) on the upper surface of the lobes, but does not produce granular soredia.

References

Recent Literature on Lichens and Mattick's Literature Search.  
USDA Plants Database (Flavoparmelia caperata).  
Index Fungorum (Flavoparmelia caperata). 
Brodo, I. M., S. D. Sharnoff, and S. Sharnoff. 2001. Lichens of North America. Yale University Press, New Haven, 795 pages. 
Flenniken, D. G. 1999. The Macrolichens In West Virginia. Published by the author: Don Flenniken, 2273 Blachleyville Rd., Wooster, Ohio 44691.  
Hale, M.E., Jr. 1986. Flavoparmelia, a new genus in the lichen family Parmeliaceae (Ascomycotina). Mycotaxon 25: 603–605.
Purvis, O. W., B. J. Coppins, D. L. Hawksworth, P. W. James & D. M. Moore. 1992. The lichen flora of Great Britain and Ireland. The British Lichen Society, Cromwell Road, London SW7 5BD.

External links

Lichens described in 1753
Lichen species
Lichens of Europe
Lichens of North America
Parmeliaceae
Taxa named by Carl Linnaeus